"Spooky" is a song by English rock band New Order. It was released in December 1993 as the fourth and final single from their sixth studio album, Republic (1993). The song would be their last single proper until 2001's "Crystal".

CD one featured remixes by Fluke, while CD two featured remixes by Paul van Dyk and Tony Garcia. Several different versions exist, notably the Singles (2005) album featured a different edit of "Spooky", which had not previously been available in the UK. The adoption of that version was problematic for some fans who felt that (like the Perfecto remix of "World") the Fluke Minimix of "Spooky" was the best single version. The promo video used the Fluke version. The 2016 re-release of Singles, which corrected many of the errors featured on the 2005 release, includes the Fluke Minimix.

Apart from its appearance on the Singles album, "Spooky" is rarely included on New Order compilations; notably, it was not featured on 1994's best-of or the expansive Retro box set.

Track listing

Chart positions

References

New Order (band) songs
1993 singles
Songs written by Bernard Sumner
Songs written by Peter Hook
Songs written by Stephen Morris (musician)
Songs written by Gillian Gilbert
Songs written by Stephen Hague
Song recordings produced by Stephen Hague
1993 songs
London Records singles